Javier Darío Romo Barrón (born January 6, 1988, in Ahome, Sinaloa) is a former Mexican professional footballer who played for Correcaminos UAT.

References

External links
ascensomx.net

Living people
1988 births
Mexican footballers
Association football goalkeepers
Salamanca F.C. footballers
Unión de Curtidores footballers
Querétaro F.C. footballers
Altamira F.C. players
Irapuato F.C. footballers
Murciélagos FC footballers
Correcaminos UAT footballers
Liga MX players
Ascenso MX players
Liga Premier de México players
People from Ahome Municipality
Footballers from Sinaloa